The willowy flounder (Tanakius kitaharae) is a flatfish of the family Pleuronectidae. Its native habitat is the temperate waters of the Western Pacific, from Southern Hokkaido in Japan to the Gulf of Bohai, the East China Sea and Taiwan.

Diet

The diet of the willowy flounder consists mainly of zoobenthos organisms, including polychaetes, crabs and other benthos crustaceans.

References

willowy flounder
Fish of East Asia
willowy flounder
Taxa named by David Starr Jordan